William David Cohen (born January 21, 1957) is a Vermont attorney and judge. He has served as an Associate Justice of the Vermont Supreme Court since December 2019.

Education and legal career 
William David Cohen was born in Queens, New York on January 21, 1957, the son of Herbert and Sandra (Jacobs) Cohen.  He attended the public schools of Rutland City, Vermont and graduated from Rutland High School in 1975. He received a Bachelor of Arts degree in Environmental Science from George Washington University in 1980 and a Juris Doctor degree from Vermont Law School in 1984.

While attending college, Cohen worked in the Washington, DC office of US Senator Robert Stafford.  While attending law school, he worked as a clerk in the legal department of the Central Vermont Public Service Corporation, followed by a part-time position as a clerk in the office of the state’s attorney for Rutland County.

After attaining admission to the bar, Cohen served as a deputy state’s attorney for Rutland County from 1984 to 1986.  From 1986 until 1999, Cohen was an attorney in private practice. In 1999, he was appointed a judge of the Vermont Superior Court by Governor Howard Dean.

Appointment to Vermont Supreme Court 
In December 2019, Governor Phil Scott appointed Cohen to serve as an associate justice of the Vermont Supreme Court, succeeding Marilyn Skoglund. He was sworn into office on December 20, 2019.

Family
In 1990, Cohen married Barbara Kinsman Buck. They are the parents of a daughter Alix, a resident of San Francisco, and a son, Robert, a resident of Killington, Vermont.

References

External links

1957 births
Living people
People from Rutland (city), Vermont
George Washington University alumni
Vermont Law and Graduate School alumni
Vermont lawyers
Vermont state court judges
Justices of the Vermont Supreme Court
20th-century American judges
21st-century American judges